In Greek mythology, Lotis (Ancient Greek: Λωτίς) was a nymph mentioned by Ovid.

Mythology 
In his (Ovid) account, at the Liberalia festival, Priapus tried to rape her when everyone had fallen asleep, but she was awakened by a sudden cry of Silenus's donkey and ran off, leaving Priapus in embarrassment as everyone else woke up too and became aware of his intentions. In another account, she was changed into a lotus, either a plant or the lotus tree to escape Priapus; later, Dryope picked a flower off the tree Lotis had become, and was transformed into a black poplar.

In Book 6 of the Fasti Ovid tells much the same story, but with the goddess Vesta rather than Lotis as the intended victim. According to some sources, Lotis was the daughter of Neptune (Poseidon) or Nereus. Ovid suggests that Priapus later kills the donkey.

What the 'lotus' (if not the tree) that Lotis turned into has stirred much debate. Ovid describes it as having reddish-purple flowers and growing near water; the Indian lotus and the water lily have both been suggested but also rejected by a number of scholars on account of them growing in water and not near it. Counter-arguments in favour of those plants include the fact that while they are rooted in sediments of water bodies, they do not grow in water over eight feet deep (that is, they grow in very swallow water).

In art
The story does not seem to feature in Ancient Greek vase-painting, and only occasionally in later art.  Priapus and Lotis appear in the right foreground of The Feast of the Gods by Giovanni Bellini (c. 1514), in an engraving by Giovanni Battista Palumba (c. 1510), and a drawing by Parmigianino of the 1530s.  Bellini keeps Priapus's aroused state visible under his clothes, Palumba has it out in the open, as Parmigianino originally did, but this has been altered subsequently, as very explicit details often were in art.  There are also some depictions of Lotis as a tree.

Gallery

Notes

References
Bayer, Andrea, Art and Love in Renaissance Italy, 2008, Metropolitan Museum of Art, 9781588393005, google books
Bull, Malcolm, The Mirror of the Gods, How Renaissance Artists Rediscovered the Pagan Gods, Oxford UP, 2005, 
Hall, James, Hall's Dictionary of Subjects and Symbols in Art, 1996 (2nd edn.), John Murray, 
Publius Ovidius Naso, Fasti translated by James G. Frazer. Online version at the Topos Text Project.
Publius Ovidius Naso, Fasti. Sir James George Frazer. London; Cambridge, MA. William Heinemann Ltd.; Harvard University Press. 1933. Latin text available at the Perseus Digital Library.
Publius Ovidius Naso, Metamorphoses translated by Brookes More (1859-1942). Boston, Cornhill Publishing Co. 1922. Online version at the Perseus Digital Library.
Publius Ovidius Naso, Metamorphoses. Hugo Magnus. Gotha (Germany). Friedr. Andr. Perthes. 1892. Latin text available at the Perseus Digital Library.

Nereids
Children of Poseidon
Metamorphoses into trees in Greek mythology
Metamorphoses into flowers in Greek mythology